Johan Christian may refer to:

 Johan Carl Christian Petersen (1813–1880), Danish seaman and interpreter
 Johan Christian Collett (1817–1895), Norwegian politician
 Johan Christian Dahl (1788–1857), Norwegian landscape painter
 Johan Christian Fabricius (1745–1808), Danish entomologist and economist
 Johan Martin Christian Lange (1818–1898), Danish botanist